Mount Livermore is a summit in the Davis Mountains in Jeff Davis County, Texas. The peak was named for Major William Livermore who used it as a point of observations and placed a base monument atop it.

In October and November 1884, Major Livermore, of the Engineer Corps, was in charge of a military expedition in making a map of western Texas. When reaching the top of the bare rock he called it "Old Baldy", named after a general officer called Baldy Smith. Baldy Peak is an alternate name.

The Livermore Cache
An extensive cache of arrow points and fragments was excavated by Susan Janes, who moved to Fort Davis with her husband in 1893. In 1895 the Janeses' son Charles, and Tom Merrill found a cairn on its highest point. They demolished the cairn and discovered a scattering of arrowheads underneath it.

Gallery

References

Landforms of Jeff Davis County, Texas